= Qowm-e Dehqān =

- Location in Afghanistan
- Coordinates: 34°11′25″N 67°24′05″E
- Country: Afghanistan
- Province: Bamyan Province
- Time zone: UTC+4:30

Qowm-e Dehqān (also Romanized as Kaumi-Dekhkan and Qawme Ḏeḩqān) is a village in Bamyan Province, Afghanistan.

== See also ==
- Bamyan Province
